Brian Harbridge (22 December 1917 – 19 March 1983) was a New Zealand cricketer. He played in three first-class matches for Canterbury from 1939 to 1941.

See also
 List of Canterbury representative cricketers

References

External links
 

1917 births
1983 deaths
New Zealand cricketers
Canterbury cricketers
Sportspeople from Te Aroha
Cricketers from Waikato